The Glicko rating system and Glicko-2 rating system are methods of assessing a player's strength in games of skill, such as chess and Go. The Glicko rating system was invented by Mark Glickman in 1995 as an improvement on the Elo rating system, and initially intended for the primary use as a chess rating system. Glickman's principal contribution to measurement is "ratings reliability", called RD, for ratings deviation.

Overview 
Mark Glickman created the Glicko rating system in 1995 as an improvement on the Elo rating system.

Both the Glicko and Glicko-2 rating systems are under public domain and have been implemented on game servers online like Pokémon Showdown, Pokémon Go, Lichess, Free Internet Chess Server, Chess.com, Online Go Server (OGS), Counter-Strike: Global Offensive, Quake Live, Team Fortress 2, Dota Underlords, Guild Wars 2, Splatoon 2 and 3, Dominion Online, TETR.IO, and competitive programming competitions.

The Reliability Deviation (RD) measures the accuracy of a player's rating, where the RD is equal to one standard deviation. For example, a player with a rating of 1500 and an RD of 50 has a real strength between 1400 and 1600 (two standard deviations from 1500) with 95% confidence.  Twice (exact: 1.96) the RD is added and subtracted from their rating to calculate this range. After a game, the amount the rating changes depends on the RD: the change is smaller when the player's RD is low (since their rating is already considered accurate), and also when their opponent's RD is high (since the opponent's true rating is not well known, so little information is being gained).  The RD itself decreases after playing a game, but it will increase slowly over time of inactivity.

The Glicko-2 rating system improves upon the Glicko rating system and further introduces the rating volatility σ. A very slightly modified version of the Glicko-2 rating system is implemented by the Australian Chess Federation.

The algorithm of Glicko

Step 1: Determine ratings deviation 

The new Ratings Deviation is found using the old Ratings Deviation:

where  is the amount of time (rating periods) since the last competition and '350' is assumed to be the RD of an unrated player. If several games have occurred within one rating period, the method treats them as having happened simultaneously. The rating period may be as long as several months or as short as a few minutes, according to how frequently games are arranged. The constant  is based on the uncertainty of a player's skill over a certain amount of time. It can be derived from thorough data analysis, or estimated by considering the length of time that would have to pass before a player's rating deviation would grow to that of an unrated player. If it is assumed that it would take 100 rating periods for a player's rating deviation to return to an initial uncertainty of 350, and a typical player has a rating deviation of 50 then the constant can be found by solving

Or

Step 2: Determine new rating 

The new ratings, after a series of m games, are determined by the following equation:

where:

 represents the ratings of the individual opponents.

 represents the rating deviations of the individual opponents.

 represents the outcome of the individual games.

Step 3: Determine new ratings deviation 
The function of the prior RD calculation was to increase the RD appropriately to account for the increasing uncertainty in a player's skill level during a period of non-observation by the model. Now, the RD is updated (decreased) after the series of games:

Glicko-2 algorithm 
Glicko-2 works in a similar way to the original Glicko algorithm, with the addition of a rating volatility  which measures the degree of expected fluctuation in a player’s rating, based on how erratic the player's performances are. For instance, a player's rating volatility would be low when they performed at a consistent level, and would increase if they had exceptionally strong results after that period of consistency. A simplified explanation of the Glicko-2 algorithm is presented below:

Step 1: Compute ancillary quantities 
Across one rating period, a player with a current rating  and ratings deviation  plays against  opponents, with ratings  and RDs , resulting in scores . We first need to compute the ancillary quantities  and :

 

where

Step 2: Determine new rating volatility 
We then need to choose a small constant  which constrains the volatility over time, for instance  (smaller values of  prevent dramatic rating changes after upset results). Then, for

we need to find the value  which satisfies . An efficient way of solving this would be to use the Illinois algorithm, a modified version of the regula falsi procedure (see  for details on how this would be done). Once this iterative procedure is complete, we set the new rating volatility  as

Step 3: Determine new ratings deviation and rating  
We then get the new RD

and new rating

These ratings and RDs are on a different scale than in the original Glicko algorithm, and would need to be converted to properly compare the two.

See also

 Chess rating system

References

External links 
 Professor Glickman's Glicko-Website
 TrueSkill  rating system by Microsoft borrows many ideas of Glicko.
 forwardloop/glicko2s Glicko-2 implementation for the JVM
 RobKohr/glicko JavaScript Glicko-2 implementation.
 mmai/glicko2js Client side javascript and node.js Glicko-2 implementation
 deepy/glicko2 Python Glicko-2 implementation.
 sublee/glicko2 Python Glicko-2 implementation.
 PlayerRatings R Glicko implementation by Alec Stephenson and Jeff Sonas.
 scala-glicko2 Scala Glicko-2 implementation.
 dimos/glicko2 Glicko-2 implementation for  Scala and Scala.js

Chess in Australia
Chess rating systems